Walter J. Kunicki (born June 9, 1958) is an American politician and former Wisconsin legislator.  He was the 71st Speaker of the Wisconsin State Assembly, serving for the 1991-1992 and 1993-1994 sessions.  A Democrat, he served 18 years in the Assembly representing south-central Milwaukee.

Biography

Born in Milwaukee, Wisconsin, Kunicki graduated from Milwaukee Technical High School and received his Bachelor's degree from the University of Wisconsin–Milwaukee in 1980.

That same year, he was elected to his first term in the Wisconsin State Assembly.  He narrowly won the Democratic nomination for the seat, topping a crowded seven-candidate primary contest.  He went on to win re-election 8 times, even as the district was redrawn in 1982, 1984, and 1992.  In 1991, after the expiration of the term of Speaker Thomas A. Loftus, who had chosen to run for Governor of Wisconsin in 1990 rather than seek re-election to the Assembly, the members elected Kunicki as the new speaker.  He continued as speaker until the Republicans took the majority in the 1994 election, and then became the Democrats' leader in the minority.  He did not run for re-election in 1998. 

Since leaving office, Kunicki has worked as a vice president at Wisconsin Energy Corporation, and has worked as a registered lobbyist for them in the Wisconsin Legislature. Kunicki is a member of the State Legislative Leaders Foundation and the National Speakers Conference.

Personal life
Earlier in his career, Kunicki was an occupational health nurse and remained a member of the Wisconsin Nurses Association through his time as a legislator.  He is not married.

Electoral history

Wisconsin Assembly 27th District (1980)

| colspan="6" style="text-align:center;background-color: #e9e9e9;"| Democratic Primary, September 9, 1980

| colspan="6" style="text-align:center;background-color: #e9e9e9;"| General Election, November 4, 1980

References

External links
 

1958 births
Living people
Politicians from Milwaukee
University of Wisconsin–Milwaukee alumni
Members of the Wisconsin State Assembly
Speakers of the Wisconsin State Assembly
American occupational health practitioners
American lobbyists